Edward Sandford Burgess (January 19, 1855 – February 23, 1928) was an American botanist and professor.

References

External links
Biography at University of Oregon Libraries Website
Find A Grave Memorial

1855 births
1928 deaths
Scientists from New York City
20th-century American botanists